The Copa de Castilla y León (Castile and León Cup) is a basketball competition between the best teams of Castile and León, organized by the Castile and León Basketball Federation. From 2002 to 2005, the different teams where facing them every round and the final was played always against CB Valladolid, the only team in ACB in that years.

Since 2006, a Final Four tournament is played every pre-season in Palencia.

Champions

History

Results

2002 
After a try in 2001 with the teams of Liga EBA, the Castile and León Federation decided to improve the tournament including in it all the elite clubs of the autonomous community. The first round was played in a one legged round-robin format by all the Liga EBA teams.

2003–04 
The second edition had a similar format but changing the first round. This was played with a two-legged round robin format by the four Liga EBA teams of the community.

2004-05 
Like in the first edition, the Liga EBA teams played the first round with a single-legged round-robin format.

2005-06 
In this edition, the Liga EBA teams played the first round with a double-legged round-robin format. The two first qualified teams played the second round against the two LEB 2 teams.

 Second round (Salamanca): Maderas Peralta Salamanca 117–118 Autocid Ford Burgos(Ávila): Matchmind Carrefour El Bulevar 107–116 Hormigones Saldaña

2006 
In summer 2006, the Castile and León Basketball Federation decided to change the format of the competition adopting a Final Four format with the four elite teams of the Community. A Copa Castilla y León EBA was created for the teams of this league. This new competition was played in 2001 as a try of this tournament.

2007 
The two Liga ACB teams, Grupo Capitol Valladolid and Grupo Begar León, reached the final after beating home team Alimentos de Palencia and Matchmind Carrefour respectively. The team of Ávila played its first Final Four after winning Ford Burgos in the qualifying game.

In the final, Grupo Capitol Valladolid won Grupo Begar León thanks to a great second half.

 Qualifying match (Ávila, 1 September): Matchmind Carrefour El Bulevar 99–91 Ford Burgos

2008 
2008 edition was the first one without Liga ACB teams after the relegation of CB Valladolid and Grupo Begar León last season to LEB Oro. Also, CB Valladolid didn't play the final game for the first time of the Copa Castilla y León history, after being defeated by Grupo Begar León in two overtimes.

Ford Burgos won its first trophy after beating Faymasa Palencia in the semifinal game and Grupo Begar León in the final. Diego García was designed MVP of the tournament.

2009 
Blancos de Rueda Valladolid recovered the Cup after beating Ford Burgos with a buzzerbeater of Brian Chase and Baloncesto León, who won Matchmind Carrefour in the qualifying game and Palencia Baloncesto in the semifinal, thanks to a good defense in the last Gimel Lewis shot.

American player of Blancos de Rueda Valladolid Brian Chase was the MVP of the Copa Castilla y León.

 Qualifying match (Ávila, 4 September): Matchmind Carrefour El Bulevar 55 - Baloncesto León 68

2010 
After beating Ford Burgos by a narrow margin in the semifinals, Palencia Baloncesto qualified for the first time to the final of the Copa Castilla y León. In this game, Blancos de Rueda Valladolid was too much team for them and the team of Liga ACB won by the widest difference in a final since there is Final Four format. American center Marcus Slaughter was the MVP of the game.

2011 
The 2011 edition is the 10th one of this Cup and it was broadcast by CyLTV 8. This was the first Copa Castilla y León to be broadcast live.

The only Liga ACB team, Blanco Rueda Valladolid, won its eight title after beating last two season third qualified of LEB Oro Ford Burgos in a tough semifinal and home team Palencia Baloncesto, who nailed its second consecutive final after beating Baloncesto León in the overtime.

Small forward Carles Bravo was designed the MVP of the Finals. For the first time, a player of the runner-up team had this consideration.

2012 
After the dissolution of Baloncesto León, Grupo Eulen Carrefour "El Bulevar" de Ávila was invited to join the tournament with Liga ACB team Blancos de Rueda Valladolid and LEB Oro teams Ford Burgos and Palencia Baloncesto.

For the first time ever, it will be played at Pabellón Polideportivo Pisuerga in Valladolid. Men's and women's tournament will be played in the same pavilion and in the same weekend.

Palencia Baloncesto achieved its first Cup in its history after beating Liga ACB team Blancos de Rueda Valladolid in a game where Palencia was leading by 26 points in the second quarter and defeating Ford Burgos in the final game, thanks to a great last quarter and to Carles Bravo, who was nominated by second year in a row MVP of the tournament. Bravo nailed 24 points for a rating of 32.

2013
After one year, the Cup came back to its most classical host: Palencia. Due to the financial trouble has CB Valladolid, the Federation of Basketball of Castile and León decided not to include the team of Liga ACB in the tournament.

The tournament will be played from 27 to 29 September with a three-game format between the three LEB teams: host team Quesos Cerrato Palencia, LEB Plata team Grupo Eulen Carrefour "El Bulevar" de Ávila and the recently created team CB Tizona, which substitutes the last LEB Oro champion CB Atapuerca, but plays with the same sponsorship naming.

Games to be played

27 September: Quesos Cerrato Palencia 91–72 Grupo Eulen Carrefour "El Bulevar" de Ávila
28 September: Grupo Eulen Carrefour "El Bulevar" de Ávila 53–86 Ford Burgos
29 September: Quesos Cerrato Palencia 69–72 Ford Burgos

2014 
CB Valladolid will play again this competition after its absence in 2013, whereby the tournament comes back to the Final Four format. Three LEB Oro teams (Ford Burgos, Quesos Cerrato Palencia and CB Valladolid, relegated from Liga ACB) and one LEB Plata team (Grupo Eulen Carrefour 'El Bulevar' de Ávila) will join the competition.

The Cup was played on 26 and 27 September in Palencia and the draw was on 1 September 2014.

2015 
After the dissolution of CB Valladolid and the resign to compete in professional leagues of Ford Burgos, both cities were represented by the new-creation teams CB Ciudad de Valladolid and CB Miraflores respectively. Palencia and San Pablo Inmobiliaria Burgos, the sponsorship name of Miraflores, were teams of LEB Oro at the upcoming season while the other two would play in LEB Plata.

The Cup was played on 26 and 27 September in Palencia.

2016
The 2016 edition was played between the two LEB Oro teams (Quesos Cerrato Palencia and San Pablo Inmobiliaria Burgos, who joined directly the semifinals) and the four LEB Plata teams, that played a previous round in Íscar. Miraflores, with the name of San Pablo Inmobiliaria Burgos won its first title, the fourth for the city of Burgos.

2017
The 2017 edition changed its format as it was played with only three teams. The two LEB Oro teams, (Palencia Baloncesto and Carramimbre CBC Valladolid) would play for a place in the final against the regional team in Liga ACB, San Pablo Burgos. This edition was played in Burgos.

2018
The 2018 edition was held in Palencia with the same format as in the previous season.

2019
The 2019 edition was held again in Palencia.

References

External links
Castile and Lion Basketball Federation website

Cas